A two-part referendum on alcohol was held in Greenland on 20 June 1978. Voters were asked whether they approved of the banning or rationing of alcohol. The ban on alcohol was rejected by 55% of voters, whilst the rationing proposal was approved by 58% of voters.

Results

Aftermath
Following the referendum, rationing was introduced in August 1979. Adults over the age of 18 were limited to 72 "points" per month. A 33cl bottle of beer was equivalent to one point. In addition, a ban on home brewing and importing malt and hops was implemented.

The points system led to points trading, with points being sold for up to 25 Danish krone whilst the price of a bottle of beer was just 5 krone. However, consumption dropped from 18.7 litres per person to 13.8 litres by 1980. Following the scrapping of the rationing system in 1982, consumption rose to 22 litres per person.

References

Notes

1978 referendums
1978 in Greenland
1978
Prohibition referendums
June 1978 events in North America